This is a list of protected areas of Nunavut.

National parks

Territorial parks

Kitikmeot Region

Kivalliq Region

Qikiqtaaluk Region

Other

References

External links

 Government of Nunavut - Nunavut Parks
 MPA Global: A database of the world's marine protected areas

Protected
Nunavut